The Madrid Protocol of 1885 was an agreement between the United Kingdom, German Empire and Spain to recognize the sovereignty of Spain over the Sulu Archipelago as well as the limit of Spanish influence in the region. Under the agreement, Spain relinquishes all claim to Borneo.

Another important point regarding the agreement relates to Article IV which guaranteed no restriction on trade to the parties of the protocol within the Archipelago and North Borneo.

North Borneo dispute
The North Borneo dispute is the territorial dispute between Malaysia and the Philippines over much of the eastern part of the state of Sabah, a territory known as North Borneo prior to the formation of the Malaysian federation. The Philippines, presenting itself as the successor state of the Sultanate of Sulu, retains a "dormant claim" on Sabah on the basis that the territory was only leased to the British North Borneo Company in 1878, with the sovereignty of the Sultanate (and subsequently the Republic) over the territory having never been relinquished. However, Malaysia considers this dispute as a "non-issue" as it interprets the 1878 agreement as that of cession and that it deems that the residents of Sabah had exercised their right to self-determination when they joined to form the Malaysian federation in 1963.

See also
 Territories claimed by the Philippines
 Greater Philippines

References

Further reading
 Leigh R. Wright. Historical Notes on the North Borneo Dispute. The Journal of Asian Studies, Vol. 25, No. 3 (May 1966), pp. 471–484.
 Leigh R. Wright. The Origins of British Borneo. Modern Asian Studies, Vol. 10, No. 1 (1976), pp. 149–154
 Leigh R. Wright. The Anglo-Spanish-German Treaty of 1885: A Step in the Development of British Hegemony in North Borneo. Australian Journal of Politics & History 18 (1), 62–75

External links
 British North Borneo, 1885 Sabah Law

History of Sabah
1885 in the United Kingdom
Treaties of the United Kingdom (1801–1922)
Treaties involving territorial changes
Boundary treaties
Borders of Malaysia
1885 treaties
Treaties of the German Empire
Treaties of Spain under the Restoration